The Jamindjung, also spelt Djamindjung, are an indigenous Australian people of the Northern Territory.

Language
Jaminjung belongs to the Yirram branch of the non Pama-Nyungan tongues, and is related closely to the language spoken by the Ngaliwurru, and, some distantly, to Nungali.

Country
W. E. H. Stanner, writing in 1936, placed the Djamindjung between the north bank of the Victoria River to the south bank of the Fitzmaurice River, with an inland extension from the Timor Sea he reckoned to be about 100 miles. Their domain included Bradshaw and the Angalarri River.

Alternative names
 Djamunjun
 Djamundon
 Djamadjong
 Jaminjang, Jaminjung
 Kaminjung
 Tjamindjung, Tjaminjun
 Murinyuwen, Murinyuwan

Notes

Citations

Sources

Aboriginal peoples of the Northern Territory